Pyotr Aleksandrovich Zgursky (born 12 July 2001) is a Belarusian professional footballer who plays for Bumprom Gomel.

References

External links 
 
 

2001 births
Living people
Belarusian footballers
Association football forwards
FC Gomel players
FC Sputnik Rechitsa players
FC Krumkachy Minsk players